Shri Swaminarayan Mandir, Junagadh (Devnagari: श्री स्वामिनारायण मन्दिर, जूनागढ) is a Hindu temple in Junagadh, Gujarat, India. This temple was ordered to be built by Swaminarayan himself, the founder of the Swaminarayan Sampradaya.

History of this temple

The city of Junagadh is nestled in the lap of Mt. Girnar.  The temple is located in the centre of the town.

The land for the temple was donated by King Hemantsinh (Jinabhai, Darbar of Panchala), and memories of him have been maintained here.  The foundation stone was laid by Gunatitanand Swami in the presence of Gopalanand Swami and other senior paramhansas on May 10, 1826, A.D. Construction was supervised by Brahmanand Swami.

The prana pratishta, or the installation of the deities, lasted for two full days with the festivities of the auspicious events.  On May 1, 1828, A.D., Swaminarayan himself installed Shri Ranchhodrai and Trikamrai in the inner sanctum. In the eastern wing, he installed Radharaman Dev and Harikrishna Maharaj and in the western side he installed Siddheswar Mahadev, Parvati, Ganesha and Nandishwar. The Mughal Subba Bahadur Khan paid a personal visit to the place on this occasion. Swaminarayan blessed the provincial head of the Mughal empire and honoured the king Hemantsinh for his gift of the land for the temple.

Swaminarayan appointed Gunatitanand Swami as the first mahant (religious and administrative head): he served in this role for over 40 years.

The Swaminarayan temple has a circumference of 278 ft. The temple here has five spires and many sculptures.

Image gallery
Images of this temple:

Notes

References

 Shri Swaminarayan Mandirs - Shri Swaminarayan Mandir, Junagadh

Swaminarayan Sampradaya
Junagadh district